Radha Soami Satsang Beas (RSSB) is a spiritual organization in Radha Soami movement. It is headed by Gurinder Singh. The main centre of RSSB is located on the banks of the Beas River in the northern Indian state of Punjab.

Establishment of the Dera at Beas 
RSSB was founded in India in 1891 by Jaimal Singh. Shiv Dayal Singh gave initiation to Baba Jaimal Singh in 1856, who then started meditating for many days on the bank of river Beas. He, then, started giving initiation to the people there in 1889 after he got retired from his job.

Lineage 
The lineage of the spiritual heads at RSSB is as follows:- 

 Jaimal Singh - 1889-1903
 Sawan Singh - 1903-1948
 Jagat Singh - 1948-1951
 Charan Singh - 1951-1990
 Gurinder Singh - 1990 – present

References

External links
 Radha Soami Satsang Beas Official Website

Radha Soami
1891 establishments in India